Cornelius J. Irwin (1876–1955) was an Irish politician. He was a Cumann na nGaedheal member of Seanad Éireann from 1922 to 1925. He was defeated at the 1925 Seanad election.

Cornelius Joseph Irwin was born at Galway, County Galway, and moved to Enniscorthy, County Wexford, in the 1890s. He was one of the founders of the Enniscorthy Echo in 1902 and was managing director to his death. Identified with Conradh na Gaeilge (the Gaelic League) and Sinn Féin he was interned in Stafford Prison and Frongoch Internment Camp (in Wales) after the Easter Rising. A farmer and a ship owner he died at his home, Kilcannon House, Enniscorthy, on 22 April 1955 aged 78.

References

1876 births
1955 deaths
Cumann na nGaedheal senators
Members of the 1922 Seanad
People from County Wexford